Morgan Barbançon Mestre (born 12 August 1992 in Paris, France) is a French and Spanish Olympic dressage rider. Representing Spain, she competed at the 2012 Summer Olympics in London where she finished 7th in team competition and 23rd in the individual competition.

Barbançon competed at the 2014 World Equestrian Games in Normandy, France where she finished 5th in team dressage, 15th in special dressage and 15th in freestyle dressage competition. She also competed at the 2015 FEI World Cup Finals in Las Vegas, Nevada where she finished 8th.

She competes for France since May 2018.

Biography
Morgan started riding at an age of three in Switzerland and started dressage at an age of 10. Morgan competed successfully in the youth division and competed at several European Championships for Ponies and Juniors. In 2012 she competed at the age of 20 at the Olympic Games in London under the vision of triple Olympic gold-medalist Anky van Grunsven. After eight years living in The Netherlands, she returned back to Switzerland in 2018. In the recent years she has competed several horses on Grand Prix level, including Painted Black, Sir Donnerhall II OLD, Girasol, Bolero, Vitana V, Heimliche Liebe, Don Lorean and Black Pearl.

Personal life
Morgan Barbancon is born to a French father and a Spanish mother. Her younger sister Alexandra Barbancon competes also in international dressage. She is fluent in French, English, Spanish, Catalan, Dutch and German.

Dressage results

Olympic Games

World Championships

European Championships

World Cup

Final

Youth Dressage European Championship

Final

References

Living people
1992 births
Sportspeople from Paris
Spanish female equestrians
Spanish dressage riders
French female equestrians
French dressage riders
Equestrians at the 2012 Summer Olympics
Equestrians at the 2020 Summer Olympics
Olympic equestrians of Spain
Olympic equestrians of France